Socialism with Chinese characteristics is a set of political theories and policies of the Chinese Communist Party (CCP) that are seen by their proponents as representing Marxism–Leninism adapted to Chinese circumstances and specific time periods, consisting of Deng Xiaoping Theory, Three Represents (Jiang Zemin), Scientific Outlook on Development (Hu Jintao), and Xi Jinping Thought. In the CCP's view, Xi Jinping Thought is considered to represent Marxist–Leninist policies suited for China's present condition while Deng Xiaoping Theory was considered relevant for the period when it was formulated.

The term entered common usage during the era of Deng Xiaoping and was largely associated with Deng's overall program of adopting elements of market economics as a means to foster growth using foreign direct investment and to increase productivity (especially in the countryside where 80% of China's population lived) while the CCP retained both its formal commitment to achieve communism and its monopoly on political power. In the party's official narrative, socialism with Chinese characteristics is Marxism–Leninism adapted to Chinese conditions and a product of scientific socialism. The theory stipulated that China was in the primary stage of socialism due to its relatively low level of material wealth and needed to engage in economic growth before it pursued a more egalitarian form of socialism, which in turn would lead to a communist society described in Marxist orthodoxy.

Primary stage of socialism

During the Mao era 
The concept of a primary stage of socialism was conceived before China introduced economic reforms. In the early 1950s, economists Yu Guangyuan, Xue Muqiao and Sun Yefang raised the question of socialist transformation in which China's economy of low productive force was in a transitional period, a position which Mao Zedong endorsed briefly until 1957. When discussing the necessity of commodity relations at the 1st Zhengzhou Conference (2–10 November 1958), for example, Mao—the Chairman of the Central Committee of the Chinese Communist Partysaid that China was in the "initial stage of socialism". However, Mao never elaborated on the idea and his successors were left to do this.

After Mao Zedong's death 
On 5 May 1978, the article "Putting into Effect the Socialist Principle of Distribution According to Work" elaborated on the idea that China was still at the first stage of reaching pure communism and that it had not become a truly socialist society. The article was written by members in the State Council's Political Research Office led by economist Yu Guangyuan on the orders of Deng Xiaoping so as to "criticize and repudiate" the beliefs of the communist left. After reading it, Deng himself authored a brief memo saying that it was "well-written, and shows that the nature of distribution by labor is not capitalist, but socialist [...] [and] to implement this principle, many things are to be done, and many institutions to be revived. In all, this is to give incentives for us to do better". The term reappeared at the 6th plenum of the 11th Central Committee on 27 June 1981 in the document "Resolution on Certain Questions in the History of our Party since the Founding of the PRC". Hu Yaobang, the CCP General Secretary, used the term in his report to the 12th National Congress on 1 September 1982. It was not until the "Resolution Concerning the Guiding Principle in Building Socialist Spiritual Civilization" at the 6th plenum of the 12th Central Committee that the term was used in the defense of the economic reforms which were being introduced.

At the 13th National Congress, acting General Secretary Zhao Ziyang on behalf of the 12th Central Committee delivered the report "Advance Along the Road of Socialism with Chinese characteristics". He wrote that China was a socialist society, but that socialism in China was in its primary stage, a Chinese peculiarity which was due to the undeveloped state of the country's productive forces. During this phase of development, Zhao recommended introducing a planned commodity economy on the basis of public ownership. The main failure of the communist right according to Zhao was that they failed to acknowledge that China could reach socialism by bypassing capitalism. The main failure of the communist left was that they held the "utopian position" that China could bypass the primary stage of socialism in which the productive forces are to be modernized.

On 5 October 1987, Yu Guangyuan, a major author of the concept, published an article entitled "Economy in the Initial Stage of Socialism" and speculated that this historical stage will last for two decades and perhaps much longer. This represents, says Ian Wilson, "a severe blight on the expectations raised during the early 70s, when the old eight-grade wage scale was being compressed to only three levels and a more even distributive system was assumed to be an important national goal". On 25 October, Zhao further expounded on the concept of the primary stage of socialism and said that the party line was to follow "One Center, Two Basic Points"—the central focus of the Chinese state was economic development, but that this should occur simultaneously through centralized political control (i.e. the Four Cardinal Principles) and upholding the policy of reform and opening up.

General Secretary Jiang Zemin further elaborated on the concept ten years later, first during a speech to the Central Party School on 29 May 1997 and again in his report to the 15th National Congress on 12 September. According to Jiang, the 3rd plenum of the 11th Central Committee correctly analyzed and formulated a scientifically correct program for the problems facing China and socialism. In Jiang's words, the primary stage of socialism was an "undeveloped stage". The fundamental task of socialism is to develop the productive forces, therefore the main aim during the primary stage should be the further development of the national productive forces. The primary contradiction in Chinese society during the primary stage of socialism is "the growing material and cultural needs of the people and the backwardness of production". This contradiction will remain until China has completed the process of primary stage of socialism—and because of it—economic development should remain the party's main focus during this stage.

Jiang elaborated on three points to develop the primary stage of socialism. The first—to develop a socialist economy with Chinese characteristics—meant developing the economy by emancipating and modernizing the forces of production while developing a market economy. The second—building socialist politics with Chinese characteristics—meant "managing state affairs according to the law", developing socialist democracy under the party and making the "people the masters of the country". The third point—building socialist culture with Chinese characteristics—meant turning Marxism into the guide to train the people so as to give them "high ideals, moral integrity, a good education, and a strong sense of discipline, and developing a national scientific, and popular socialist culture geared to the needs of modernization, of the world, and of the future".

When asked how long the primary stage of socialism would last, Zhao replied "[i]t will be at least 100 years [...] [before] socialist modernization will have been in the main accomplished". The state constitution states that "China will be in the primary stage of socialism for a long time to come". As with Zhao, Jiang believed that it would take at least 100 years to reach a more advanced stage.

Socialist market economy 

Deng Xiaoping, the architect of the Chinese economic reforms, did not believe that the market economy was synonymous with capitalism or that planning was synonymous with socialism. During his southern tour, he said that "planning and market forces are not the essential difference between socialism and capitalism. A planned economy is not the definition of socialism, because there is planning under capitalism; the market economy happens under socialism, too. Planning and market forces are both ways of controlling economic activity".

Ideological justification 
In the 1980s, it became evident to Chinese economists that the Marxist theory of the law of value—understood as the expression of the labor theory of value—could not serve as the basis of China's pricing system. They concluded that Marx never intended his theory of law of value to work "as an expression of 'concretized labor time'". Marx's notion of "prices of production" was meaningless to the Soviet-styled planned economies since price formations were according to Marx established by markets. Soviet planners had used the law of value as a basis to rationalize prices in the planned economy. According to Soviet sources, prices were "planned with an eye to the [...] basic requirements of the law of value". However, the primary fault with the Soviet interpretation was that they tried to calibrate prices without a competitive market since according to Marx competitive markets allowed for an equilibrium of profit rates which led to an increase in the prices of production. The rejection of the Soviet interpretation of the law of value led to the acceptance of the idea that China was still in the primary stage of socialism. The basic argument was that conditions envisaged by Marx for reaching the socialist stage of development did not yet exist in China.

Mao said that the imposition of "progressive relations of production" would revolutionize production. His successor's rejection of this view according to A. James Gregor has thwarted the ideological continuity of Maoism—officially Mao Zedong Thought. Classical Marxism had argued that a socialist revolution would only take place in advanced capitalist societies and its success would signal the transition from a capitalist commodity-based economy to a "product economy" in which goods would be distributed for people's need and not for profit. If because of a lack of a coherent explanation in the chance of failure this revolution did not occur, the revolutionaries would be forced to take over the responsibilities of the bourgeoisie. Chinese communists are thus looking for a new Marxist theory of development. Party theorist Luo Rongqu recognized that the founders of Marxism had never "formulated any systematic theory on the development of the non-Western world" and said that the CCP should "establish their own synthesized theoretical framework to study the problem of modern development". According to A. James Gregor, the implication of this stance is that "Chinese Marxism is currently in a state of profound theoretical discontinuity".

Private ownership 
The Chinese government's understanding of private ownership is claimed to be rooted in classical Marxism. According to party theorists, since China adopted state ownership when it was a semi-feudal and semi-colonial country, it is claimed to be in the primary stage of socialism. Because of this, certain policies and system characteristicssuch as commodity production for the market, the existence of a private sector and the reliance of the profit motive in enterprise management—were changed. These changes were allowed as long as they improved productivity and modernized the means of production, thus furthering the development of socialism.

The CCP still considers private ownership to be non-socialist. However, according to party theorists, the existence and growth of private ownership does not necessarily undermine socialism or promote capitalism in China. They argue that Karl Marx and Friedrich Engels never proposed the immediate abolishment of private ownership. According to Engels' book Principles of Communism, the proletariat can only abolish private ownership when the necessary conditions have been met. In the phase before the abolishment of private ownership, Engels proposed progressive taxation, high inheritance taxes and compulsory bond purchases to restrict private property, while using the competitive powers of state-owned enterprises to expand the public sector. Marx and Engels proposed similar measures in The Communist Manifesto with regard to advanced countries, but since China was economically undeveloped, party theorists called for flexibility regarding the party's handling of private property. According to party theorist Liu Shuiyuan, the New Economic Policy program initiated by Soviet authorities in the aftermath of the war communism program is a good example of flexibility by socialist authorities.

Party theorist Li Xuai said that private ownership inevitably involved capitalist exploitation. However, Li regards private property and exploitation as necessary in the primary stage of socialism, claiming that capitalism in its primary stage uses remnants of the old society to build itself. Sun Liancheng and Lin Huiyong said that Marx and Engels—in their interpretation of The Communist Manifesto—criticized private ownership when it was owned solely by the bourgeoisie, but not individual ownership in which everyone owns the means of production, hence this cannot be exploited by others. Individual ownership is considered consistent with socialism, since Marx wrote that a post-capitalist society would entail the rebuilding of "associated social individual ownership".

See also 

 Ideology of the Chinese Communist Party
 Revisionism (Marxism)
 Socialist ideology of the Kuomintang
 Socialism in one country
 Socialist market economy
 State capitalism
 Party-state capitalism

References

Citations

Sources

Further reading 

 Gregor, A. James (2014). Marxism and the Making of China. A Doctrinal History. Palgrave Macmillan.

Market socialism
Ideology of the Chinese Communist Party
Economic history of the People's Republic of China